The Näätämö (Finland) or Neiden (Norway) is a river in Finland's Lapland, north of Lake Inari. It flows from Lake Iijärvi in Inari Municipality through Norway's Sør-Varanger Municipality and empties into the Neidenfjorden, an arm off the main Varangerfjorden.

At several points, the river widens into lakes, of which the largest are Lakes Kaarttilompolo, Vuodasluobal, and Opukas.

Based on annual catch, the Neiden is Norway's third most productive river for salmon fishing. Atlantic salmon, lake trout, sea trout, graylings and pike are all indigenous species.

References

External links
 

Rivers of Troms og Finnmark
International rivers of Europe
 
Lakes of Inari, Finland
Rivers of Norway